John Sheehy may refer to:

 John Sheehy (administrator) (1889–1949), British colonial official
 John Sheehy (architect) (born 1942),  American architect
 John Joe Sheehy (1897–1980), Irish political/military activist and sportsperson
 John R. Sheehy (born 1947), member of the Illinois House of Representatives